The 1973 Amateur World Series run by FIBA is listed in the history books as "Amateur World Series XXI" or "Baseball World Cup XXI" even though the event numbered "XXII" actually had begun and finished earlier - the 1973 Amateur World Series run by rival group FEMBA. Once the two organizations reconciled later in the decade, the current numbering system was put into place. The FIBA 1973 Amateur World Series was held in Havana, Cuba from November 25 through December 9, 1973.

Final standings

References

Baseball World Cup, 1973
Baseball World Cup
1973
Amateur World Series
Amateur World Series
Amateur World Series
20th century in Havana
Baseball competitions in Havana